Brieana Zuly Hallo (born 20 November 2003) is an American-born Dominican footballer who plays as a forward for Padua Academy and as a midfielder for the Dominican Republic women's national team.

International career
Hallo has appeared for the Dominican Republic at the 2020 CONCACAF Women's Olympic Qualifying Championship qualification.

Personal life
Hallo is of Dominican and Ecuadorian descents.

References

External links

2003 births
Living people
Citizens of the Dominican Republic through descent
Dominican Republic women's footballers
Women's association football forwards
Women's association football midfielders
Dominican Republic women's international footballers
Dominican Republic people of Ecuadorian descent
Sportspeople of Ecuadorian descent
People from New Castle County, Delaware
Soccer players from Delaware
American women's soccer players
American sportspeople of Dominican Republic descent
American people of Ecuadorian descent
21st-century American women